State Route 66 (SR 66) is a  state highway that is located completely within Towns County in the extreme northeastern part of the U.S. state of Georgia.

Route description
SR 66 begins at an intersection with US 76/SR 2/SR 515 in Young Harris. It heads northwest to the North Carolina state line. The roadway continues as Young Harris Road to the unincorporated community of Warne, North Carolina.

History

SR 66 originally existed in two sections north and south of the state's highest peak, Brasstown Bald. The southern route provided access to the top of the mountain, while the northern portion was only accessible by a long-closed wagon road built in the 1950s. A projected highway was planned to replace the wagon road, but the project was canceled in 1982 when the area around it was designated a wilderness area. When the southern completion of SR 66 was canceled, SR 180 was extended along the connecting part and the remainder became SR 180 Spur. The former wagon road is still in use as Wagon Train Trail.

Major intersections

See also

References

External links

 Georgia Roads (Routes 61 - 80)
 Local.live.com aerial view of Georgia S.R. 66

066
Transportation in Towns County, Georgia